Tyler Dupree (born 8 February 2000) is a rugby league footballer who plays as a  for the Salford Red Devils in the Betfred Super League.

He previously spent time on loan from the Leeds Rhinos at the York City Knights, Featherstone Rovers and the Batley Bulldogs in the Championship. Dupree has also played for Oldham and the Widnes Vikings in the Betfred Championship.

Background
Dupree's great uncle Billy Joe Dupree is a Dallas Cowboys Superbowl winner.

Playing career
Dupree played at youth level for the Yorkshire origin and England Academy sides whilst at Leeds. 

In May 2022 Dupree made his Salford Super League début against the Rhinos.

References

External links
Salford Red Devils profile
Leeds Rhinos profile
Oldham profile

2000 births
Living people
Batley Bulldogs players
England Knights national rugby league team players
English rugby league players
English people of American descent
Featherstone Rovers players
Oldham R.L.F.C. players
Rugby league props
Salford Red Devils players
Widnes Vikings players
York City Knights  players